László Dvorák (born 24 November 1964 in Kőszeg) is a Hungarian former wrestler who competed in the 1988 Summer Olympics, in the 1992 Summer Olympics, and in the 1996 Summer Olympics.

References

1964 births
Living people
Olympic wrestlers of Hungary
Wrestlers at the 1988 Summer Olympics
Wrestlers at the 1992 Summer Olympics
Wrestlers at the 1996 Summer Olympics
Hungarian male sport wrestlers